Videography is the process of capturing moving images on electronic media (e.g., videotape, direct to disk recording, or solid state storage) and even streaming media.  The term includes methods of video production and post-production. It used to be considered the video equivalent of cinematography (moving images recorded on film stock), but the advent of digital video recording in the late 20th century blurred the distinction between the two, as in both methods the intermediary mechanism became the same. Nowadays, any video work could be called videography, whereas commercial motion picture production would be called cinematography. 

A videographer is a person who works in the field of videography and/or video production. News broadcasting relies heavily on live television where videographers engage in electronic news gathering (ENG) of local news stories.

Uses

The arrival of computers and the Internet in the 1980s created a global environment where videography covered many more fields than just shooting video with a camera, including digital animation (such as Flash), gaming, web streaming, video blogging, still slideshows, remote sensing, spatial imaging, medical imaging, security camera imaging, and in general the production of most bitmap and vector based assets.  As the field progresses, videographers may produce their assets entirely on a computer without ever involving an imaging device, using software-driven solutions. Moreover, the very concept of sociability and privacy are being reformed by the proliferation of cell-phone, surveillance video, or Action-cameras, which are spreading at an exceptional rate globally.

A videographer may be the actual camera operator or they may be the person in charge of the visual design of a production (the latter being the equivalent of a cinematographer).

Videography in social science 
In social sciences,  videography also refers to a specific research method of video analysis, that combines ethnography with the recording of sequences of interaction that are analysed in details with methods developed on the basis of conversation analysis. One of the best known application is in workplace studies.

Videographers
On a set, in a television studio, the videographer is usually a camera operator of a professional video camera, sound, and lighting. As part of a typical electronic field production (EFP) television crew, videographers usually work with a television producer.  However, for smaller productions (e.g. corporate and event videography), a videographer often works alone with a single-camera setup or in the case of a multiple-camera setup, as part of a larger television crew with lighting technician, grips and sound operators.

Typically, videographers are distinguished from cinematographers in that they use digital hard-drive, flash cards or tape drive video cameras vs. 70mm IMAX, 35mm, 16mm or Super 8mm mechanical film cameras. Videographers manage smaller, event scale productions (commercials, documentaries, legal depositions, live events, short films, training videos, weddings), differing from individualized large production team members. The advent of high definition digital video cameras, however, has blurred this distinction.

Videographers maintain and operate a variety of video camera equipment, sound recording devices, edit footage, and stay up to date with technological advances. With modern video camcorders, professional studio quality videos can be produced at low cost rivaling large studios.  Many major studios have stopped using film as a medium due to linear-editing devices no longer being made and the availability for amateurs to produce acceptable videos using DSLRs (Digital single-lens reflex camera). Videographers use non-linear editing software on home computers.

See also 
 3D film
Cinematography
Camera coverage
Camera operator
Camera tracking
Cinematic techniques
Digital cinema
Event videography
Filmmaking
Underwater videography
Video production
Wedding videography

References

Further reading
 Knoblauch H, Tuma R (2011) Videography: an interpretive approach to video-recorded micro-social interaction. In: Margolis E., Pauwels L. (eds) The Sage Handbook of Visual Methods. Thousand Oaks, CA: Sage, 414–430.

 
Film production
Television terminology
Cinematography
Film and video technology